Zoltán Kelemen (born 31 July 1986) is a Romanian former competitive figure skater. He is an eight-time Romanian national champion. He qualified for the free skate at the 2014 Winter Olympics, the 2014 World Championships, five European Championships, and two World Junior Championships.

Personal life 
Kelemen was born on 31 July 1986 in Miercurea Ciuc, Romania. He lost the sight in his right eye at age seven, following an accident involving an aerosol can.

Career 
Due to his vision impairment, Kelemen fails the yearly physical Romania requires of its athletes, making him ineligible for government funding for his training and coaching. He is required to sign an annual waiver declaring that he is competing "on his own responsibility."

In the 2004–05 and 2005–06 season, Kelemen competed on the ISU Junior Grand Prix series and at the World Junior Championships. In 2007, he won his first senior national title and was given his debut at the European Championships and senior World Championships.

At the 2009 Nebelhorn Trophy, Kelemen earned a spot for Romania in the Olympic men's event. He began training in California and qualified for the free skate for the first time in his career at the 2010 European Championships. He then competed at the 2010 Olympics, placing 29th.

Kelemen placed a career-best 14th at the 2012 European Championships. In August 2012, he decided to train in Switzerland with Gheorghe Chiper; he also works in Switzerland as he receives little support from the Romanian skating association. Kelemen earned another Olympic berth for Romania at the 2013 Nebelhorn Trophy. At the 2014 Winter Olympics, he qualified for the free skate and finished 23rd.

Programs

Results 
GP: Grand Prix; JGP: Junior Grand Prix

2004–05 to 2013–14

1998–99 to 2003–04

References

External links

 
 Zoltan Kelemen at Tracings
  at Rinkresults

Romanian sportspeople of Hungarian descent
Romanian male single skaters
Sportspeople from Miercurea Ciuc
1986 births
Living people
Figure skaters at the 2010 Winter Olympics
Figure skaters at the 2014 Winter Olympics
Olympic figure skaters of Romania
Székely people